A. abbreviatus may refer to: 

Acestrorhynchus abbreviatus, a fish in the family Acestrorhynchidae
Acilius abbreviatus, a predaceous diving beetle 
Agrothereutes abbreviatus, a parasitic wasp